The troland (symbol Td), named after Leonard T. Troland, is a unit of conventional retinal illuminance.  It is meant as a method for correcting photometric measurements of luminance values impinging on the human eye by scaling them by the effective pupil size. It is equal to retinal illuminance produced by a surface whose luminance is one nit when the apparent area of the entrance pupil of the eye is 1 square millimeter.

The troland unit was proposed in 1916 by Leonard T. Troland, who called it a photon.

The troland typically refers to the ordinary or photopic troland, which is defined in terms of the photopic luminance:
,

where L is the photopic luminance in cd m−2 and p is pupil area in mm2.

A scotopic troland is also sometimes defined:
,

where L′ is the scotopic luminance in cd m−2 and p is pupil area in mm2.

Although named "retinal illuminance" (and originally named "photon" by Troland), trolands do not measure the actual photon flux incident on the retina; that quantity depends on the specific wavelengths of light that constitute the luminance used in the calculation.

Units conversion
Troland does not directly convert to other units, being a retinal luminance per unit area of a pupil.
 
Assuming the corneal luminance L from an extended source, the pupil diameter p and the focal length of the eye F, the retinal luminance is:

Lr [lm / m^2]  = pi * L / 4 / (f/#)^2 ~ pi * L * p^2 / 4 / F^2.

Multiplying by the pupil area : 

Alternatively, the retinal illuminance 

As provided by a more accurate optical calculations, the conversion factor is 278 rather than 289 as demonstrated by simplified considerations above.

Assuming a Lambertian surface, 1 cd/m^2 = pi lm/m^2 = pi lux. That is, 1 [cd/m^2] = 289/pi [Troland] ~ 92 [Troland]

Physical quantities
 luminance
equivalent luminance

Unit system
centimeter-gram-second (cgs)

Basic unit dimensions
[length]^(-2) [luminous intensity]

Comparisons
 
 ≈ 0.8 × luminance of a kerosene candle (≈ 12000 cd/m^2 )
 ≈ luminance of a sperm candle (≈ 10000 cd/m^2 )
 ≈ luminance of an average daytime clear sky (≈ 8000 cd/m^2 )

See also
Leonard T. Troland
Troland Research Awards

References

Vision
Non-SI metric units
Units of illuminance